The Nations team event competition at the FIS Alpine World Ski Championships 2023 was held at Roc de Fer ski course in Méribel on 14 February 2023.

FIS Overall Nations Cup standings
The participating nations were seeded according to the overall Nations Cup standings prior to the World Championships.

Teams marked in green participated.

Bracket

References

Nations team event